William John Wellington (10 May 1879 – 2 March 1939) was a Miner and member of the Queensland Legislative Assembly.

Early days
Wellington was born in Adelong, New South Wales, to parents Joseph Wellington and his wife Catherine Jane (née Bennetts). He was still an infant when his family moved to Charters Towers and he attended Charters Towers State School. At fourteen years of age he lost a leg in a mining accident and at nineteen he was Secretary of the Amalgamated Workers Association (soon to become the Australian Workers' Union), a position he held for fifteen years.

He was associated with various other miners' organisations in Charters Towers, including vice-president of the Australian Labor Federation and a trustee of The Worker, the Labour-associated Newspaper.

Political career
At the 1912 state election, Wellington, for the Labor Party, won the seat of Charters Towers, beating the sitting Ministerial member Robert Williams. He held the seat until his death in 1939. He rarely spoke in Parliament but when he did it was usually about the mining industry and for improvement of the conditions of workers.

Personal life
On 10 April 1917, Wellington married Violet Beatrice Annie Ruthenberg (died 1964) and together had three sons and three daughters.

He died in office in Charters Towers in 1939 and was buried in the Lynd Highway Cemetery.

References

Members of the Queensland Legislative Assembly
1879 births
1939 deaths
People from Adelong, New South Wales